Julien Duranville (born 5 May 2006) is a Belgian professional footballer who plays as a forward for Bundesliga club Borussia Dortmund.

Club career
Duranville is a youth product of Anderlecht, signing his first contract in May 2021. He made his professional debut on 22 May 2022, in a 1–1 Belgian First Division A draw against Club Brugge. On 27 January 2023, Duranville signed for Bundesliga club Borussia Dortmund.

International career
Duranville was born in Uccle in Belgium to a Belgian/Martinican father and Congolese mother in Etterbeek. He is a youth international for Belgium.

Career statistics

References

External links
 
 
 

2006 births
Living people
Belgian people of Ivorian descent
Belgian sportspeople of Democratic Republic of the Congo descent
Belgian footballers
Association football forwards
Belgium youth international footballers
Belgian Pro League players
Challenger Pro League players
R.S.C. Anderlecht players
RSCA Futures players
Borussia Dortmund players
Expatriate footballers in Germany
Belgian expatriate footballers
Belgian expatriate sportspeople in Germany